Shaji Kailas (born 8 February 1965) is an Indian film director and screenwriter known for his works in Malayalam cinema. Shaji got a breakthrough with the comedy film Dr. Pasupathy (1990). 

He is best known for his action films with mainly focusing on political thriller and crime genres such as Thalastaanam (1992), Sthalathe Pradhana Payyans (1993), Ekalavyan (1993), Mafia (1993), Commissioner (1994), The King (1995), Aaraam Thampuran (1997), Narasimham (2000), Valliettan (2000), Kaduva and Kaapa (2022).

Early and personal life
Shaji was born to Shivaraman Nair who worked as an executive engineer in P.W.D & Janakiyamma on 8 February 1965.

He is married to actress Annie. They currently reside at Trivandrum, Kerala, India and have three sons Jagan, Sharon, and Rushin.

Career

1984–1991: Early career 
Shaji Kailas started his film career as assistant director under renowned writer director Balu Kiriyath in 1984. Shaji Kailas' debut as a director was in 1989 with The News, starring Suresh Gopi in the lead role. Scripted by Jagadish, this investigative thriller was a hit at the box office. With the film, Shaji succeeded in gaining attention of film viewers. But his second release Sunday 7 PM, came out in 1990 was a failure. Later in the same year, he directed Dr. Pasupathy, a political satire, with Innocent in a leading role. Dr. Pashupathi, written by Renji Panicker, ended up as one of the biggest grosser of the year. This film also marked the beginning of Shaji Kailas- Renji Panicker combo, which later went into making of several super hits. But, the success of Dr. Pashupathy was followed by Souhrudam, a romantic comedy starring Mukesh and Sai Kumar in the leading roles. His next film, Kilukkampetti, with Jayaram in the lead role was hit. After this in 1992 he switched to action films with the blockbuster Thalastaanam, which would go on to become his trademark genre.

1992–2000: Breakthrough 
In the year 1992 Shaji Kailas got his first real career break. His association with Renji Panicker brought out Thalastaanam, with Suresh Gopi in the leading role. Revolved around student politics, Thalastaanam also marked the rebirth of Renji Panicker as a scriptwriter. This film also marked Suresh Gopi's first step to super stardom. The cinematography of the film was done by Ravi K. Chandran. This film also saw the rise of Narendra Prasad, who later became one of the most acclaimed villains in the Malayalam industry. In the same year Shaji Kailas tried out a comedy flick, Neelakurukkan, which was above average grosser. But in the beginning of 1993 Shaji Kailas landed up again with another blockbuster, Sthalathe Pradhana Payyans. In the same year, Ekalavyan completed a run of 150 days in the theatres & played a crucial role in elevating lead actor Suresh Gopi to superstardom. Again in the same year, the Shaji Kailas-Renji Panicker-Suresh Gopi team returned with Mafia, a gangster film completely shot in Bangalore. It was still known for its well-choreographed action sequences that pitted against an upcoming crime boss Ravishankar portrayed by Suresh Gopi against the ever-threatening Gowda brothers portrayed by Tiger Prabhakar and Babu Antony.

In 1994 Commissioner, (again with Suresh Gopi in title role) broke several box office records and went on to become the highest grossing film of the year. In 1995, he collaborated with Mammootty for the first time in The King which was the highest grossing Malayalam film at the time and ran successfully for 200 days in several centers. A turning point in his career, the success of the film made him one of the most commercially successful and sought after directors in Malayalam film industry. In the next year, in 1997 Shaji Kailas again joined with Ranjith for a low-budget action film titled Asuravamsam, with Manoj K. Jayan, Siddique and Biju Menon in leading roles. This film was criticized by many for its gory violence. He also done some cinematography for action sequences of the film. Asuravamsam was also an average grosser. In the same year, he again joined with Ranjith to make Aaram Thamburan, a turning point in his film career. In this film, he joined with Mohanlal for the first time. This film was the highest-grossing Malayalam film at the time and was able to complete 250 days in theatres. Then came The Truth, in 1998, with Mammooty in the lead role. It was an investigative thriller. In 1999, he directed F. I. R, another action flick with his friend Suresh Gopi as the lead actor scripted by Dennis Joseph. F. I. R emerged one of the top grossers of the year.

2000–2012: Commercial stardom, decline and hiatus 
In 2000, he directed two films. Narasimham, released in the first weeks of the year, with Mohanlal in the lead role swept the box office and became the highest-grossing Malayalam film ever. Scripted by Ranjith, this film completed 150 days in theatres. Just after the big success of Narasimham, again Shaji Kailas paired with Renjith, but this time it was Mammootty in the leading role. Valliettan, the Onam release of 2000 also successfully completed 150 days at box office. Then came Thandavam, though evoked one of the biggest initial pulls in the history of Malayalam cinema, Thandavam failed at the box office. He took a break for one year. It was at this time, Shaji again tried out his luck in Tamil with Jana in (2004).

In the year 2004 Shaji Kailas made a comeback in Malayalam with  Natturajavu. With Mohanlal in lead role and, scripted by T. A. Shahid, Natturajavu was a commercial success in the box office. In the year 2005 Shaji Kailas directed The Tiger, an investigative thriller starring Suresh Gopi. In 2006, Chinthamani Kolacase, a vigilante action thriller with Suresh Gopi in leading role and Baba Kalyani with Mohanlal released. Both were hits at the box office. However, his first film with Dileep, The Don, turned into a huge flop in 2006. The next film, Baba Kalyani, starring Mohanlal, was a moderate hit at box office which completed 75 days in theatres. But later, Shaji failed to find his rhythm. Time in 2007, Alibhai and Sound of Boot in 2008 was not up to the mark. In January 2010, Shaji Kailas directed Drona 2010, which turned out to be another fiasco. Beginning of 2011 showcased his attempt to reclaim his position within Malayalam industry with the sequel of yesteryear mega hit "August 1", 15 August which garnered heavy negative reviews from critics and audiences alike and was finally declared as another flop by Shaji Kailas. His next movie was with Mammotty and Suresh Gopi named The King and the Commissioner the movie was the next part of the yesteryear blockbusters The King and Commissioner. His next movie was Simhasanam with Prithviraj Sukumaran and Sai Kumar in the lead role. The movie was released in July 2012 and ends up with a huge disaster. After the consecutive flops Shaji Kailas took a break from direction.

2022: Resurgence 
On 16 October 2019, it was announced that Shaji Kailas will be coming back from his hiatus with Kaduva starring Prithviraj Sukumaran in the lead. Kaduva was released on 7 July 2022. The film received mixed to positive reviews from critics. The film grossed around ₹50 crore and became a commercial success. He again directed 3rd time with Kaapa starring Prithviraj Sukumaran in the lead role. Kaapa received positive to mixed reviews from critics and became an average grosser. His next directorial project, Alone, starring Mohanlal in the lead role was released to highly negative reviews and turned out to be a box-office bomb.

Filmography

Director

Other credits

Accolades
Filmfare Awards South
1993: Best Director Malayalam – Ekalavyan

Asianet Film Awards
2000: Best Director Award – Narasimham

References

External links

 
 On the trail of the 'Tiger'
 Shaji Kailas and Family
 Shaji Kailas in Keralacafe
 Shaji Kailas's movies in Malayalam Movies

20th-century Indian film directors
Malayalam film directors
Film directors from Thiruvananthapuram
Tamil film directors
1965 births
Living people
Filmfare Awards South winners
Malayalam screenwriters
21st-century Indian film directors
Film producers from Thiruvananthapuram
20th-century Indian dramatists and playwrights
Screenwriters from Thiruvananthapuram
People from Thiruvananthapuram
21st-century Indian dramatists and playwrights
Indian Hindus